The barfin flounder (Verasper moseri) is a flatfish of the family Pleuronectidae. Its native habitat is the northwestern Pacific, specifically the Sea of Okhotsk, Japan's northern Pacific coast, the Strait of Tartary and the Kuril Islands.

References

barfin flounder
Sea of Okhotsk
barfin flounder
Taxa named by David Starr Jordan